The 1989 Critérium du Dauphiné Libéré was the 41st edition of the cycle race and was held from 29 May to 5 June 1989. The race started in Divonne-les-Bains and finished in Aix-les-Bains. The race was won by Charly Mottet of the RMO team.

Teams
Fifteen teams, containing a total of 119 riders, participated in the race:

 
 
 
 
 
 
 
 
 
 
 
 
 
 Colombia amateur team
 USSR amateur team

Route

General classification

References

Further reading

1989
1989 in French sport
May 1989 sports events in Europe
June 1989 sports events in Europe